Dr. Ferenc Székely (11 March 1842 – 17 March 1921) was a Hungarian politician, who served as Minister of Justice between 1910 and 1917. He also served as interim Minister of Religion and Education in 1910.

References
 Magyar Életrajzi Lexikon

1842 births
1921 deaths
People from Szombathely
Education ministers of Hungary
Justice ministers of Hungary